Pandit Sankha Chatterjee (born 1934) is an Indian tabla player. He studied under three traditional Tabla Gharana in strict Parampara tradition.

Early life
Born into a musical family in Calcutta, India. His father was a doctor and musical enthusiast, exposing him to formal tuition early in life under Ustad Maseet Khan of the Farukhabad Gharana of Tabla. He Studied under Ustad Maseet Khan, Sankha subsequently learnt from his son Ustad Keramatulla Khan and later from late tabla maestro Ustad Alla Rakha Khan of the Punjab Gharana.

Career
Sankha Chatterjee's style is a  blend of three leading Gharanas (schools), the Farukkabad, Punjab and Delhi Gharanas. He still performs and teaches. He divides his time teaching in Berlin and India as his bases and holds workshops across Europe and the United States. In 1984 he taught and performed at the Istituto Interculturale di Studi Musicali Comparati in Venice alongside sitar player Budhaditya Mukherjee.

His leading students are amongst some of the leading virtuosos of the younger generation of tabla players such as Gouri Shankar Karmakar, Subhojyoti Guha, Amit Chatterjee, Mihir Kundu, Friedemann Zintel and Federico Sanesi.

Personal life
His elder daughter Vidushi Sangeeta BandyopadhyayGIMA nominated, is a leading classical vocalist of the Lucknow, Patiala and Indore Gharana of Indian classical sangeet.

References

External links 
http://www.tabla-berlin.com/

1934 births
Living people
Hindustani instrumentalists
Indian male classical musicians
Tabla players